Artiom Tsepotan (born 9 April 1978 in Kharkiv) is a Ukrainian chess player holding the title of International master.   

He attended the Kharkiv chess school (Харківська шахова школа) under the guidance of Boris Khanukov. In 2000 he obtained a degree in education at the Kharkiv National Pedagogical University.

He won the Kharkiv city junior championship U20 in 1996 and placed third in the Beirut open in 1998. 
For many years an instructor at the Kharkiv chess school, in the first years 2000 he was the coach of Anna Ushenina, who won the Women's World Championship 2012 in Khanty-Mansiysk. 

In 2015-16 Tsepotan was an instructor on the internet of Zhou Liran, who in August 2017, at the age of 9 years, 3 months and 22 days, became the youngest ever National Master of the U.S. Chess Federation . In 2019 Zhou Liran won the U12 World Youth Championship at Weifang. 

In May 2011 Tsepotan launched the website 2700chess.com, which reports the live rating of    
Grandmasters with over 2,700 Elo points ("Super GMs").

References

External links
 Personal website
 
 
 Artiom Tsepotan, the man who founded 2700chess.com (interview by ChessBase, April 2020) 

Ukrainian chess players
Chess International Masters
Sportspeople from Kharkiv
1978 births
Living people